The Newcastle upon Tyne trolleybus system once served the city of Newcastle upon Tyne in England.  Opened in 1935, it gradually replaced the Newcastle tram network.

By the standards of the various now-defunct trolleybus systems in the United Kingdom, the Newcastle system was a large one, with a total of 28 routes, and a maximum fleet of 204 trolleybuses.

Two of the distinctive yellow-liveried former Newcastle trolleybuses are now preserved, one at the East Anglia Transport Museum at Carlton Colville, Suffolk, and the other LTN 501 at Beamish Open Air Museum sometimes on loan to The Trolleybus Museum at Sandtoft, Lincolnshire.

See also

Transport in Tyne and Wear
List of trolleybus systems in the United Kingdom

References

Notes

Further reading

External links

National Trolleybus Archive
British Trolleybus Society, based in Reading
National Trolleybus Association, based in London

History of Newcastle upon Tyne
Transport in Newcastle upon Tyne
Transport in Tyne and Wear
Newcastle upon Tyne
Newcastle upon Tyne